Albania participated in the Junior Eurovision Song Contest 2018 in Minsk, Belarus with the song "Barbie" performed by Efi Gjika. The Albanian broadcaster RTSH was responsible for the organization of their representative at the contest. Their entry was selected through Junior Fest 2018, a national selection process consisting of sixteen artists competed in order to become the Albanian representative on 23 September 2018.

Background

Prior to the 2018 contest, Albania had participated in the Junior Eurovision Song Contest four times since its first entry in 2012, only opting not to participate at the 2013 and 2014 contests. In 2016, Klesta Qehaja represented Albania in Valletta, Malta with the song "Besoj". The country ended in 13th place out of 17 countries, achieving 38 points. In 2017, Ana Kodra represented Albania in Tbilisi, Georgia with the song "Don't Touch My Tree" and participated in the 2018 national final but did not win.

Before Junior Eurovision

National final
The national final Junior Fest 2018 took place on 23 September 2018. It consisted of sixteen competing acts participating in a televised production at Amphitheater of the Lake Park in Tirana.

At Junior Eurovision
During the opening ceremony and the running order draw which both took place on 19 November 2018, Albania was drawn to perform fourth on 25 November 2018, following Kazakhstan and preceding Russia.

Voting

Detailed voting results

References

Albania
2018
Junior Eurovision Song Contest